Duplex edwardsi is a moth of the family Erebidae first described by Michael Fibiger in 2010. It is known from the northern parts of Australia's Northern Territory.

The wingspan is 7.5–9 mm. The crosslines are all present and black. The basal line is marked at the upper half. The antemedial line is prominent and sharply angled subcostally. The subterminal line is prominent and curved inwardly below the reniform stigma. The subterminal line is weakly marked and waved and the terminal line is marked by dense black interneural spots. The hindwing is light grey, without a discal spot and the underside of the forewing is dark grey and the underside of the hindwing is grey, with an indistinct discal spot.

References

Micronoctuini
Taxa named by Michael Fibiger
Moths described in 2010